Eastern Avenue may refer to:

 Eastern Avenue (Baltimore)
 Eastern Avenue (Las Vegas)
 Eastern Avenue, London
 Eastern Avenue in Cardiff, part of the A48 road
 Eastern Avenue (Toronto), an east-west street in Toronto, Ontario, Canada
 Eastern Avenue (Washington, D.C.), one of three boundary streets between Washington, D.C., and the state of Maryland

See also 
 東區 (disambiguation)
 Eastern (disambiguation)